Punk Rocksteady is the seventh full-length studio album as well as the first cover album by California ska punk band Mad Caddies, which was released on June 15, 2018 by Fat Wreck Chords. It was released four years after their full-length Dirty Rice (2014). The album consists of twelve originally punk rock songs that were hand-picked by the band alongside Fat Wreck Chords owner and NOFX singer Fat Mike, who also produced the album, and transformed into their trademark reggae sound, while also using influences from other genres, like dancehall, rock music, ska, Americana and more. The entire album was made available for streaming a day before its release.

Track listing 
 "Sorrow" (Bad Religion) - 3:21
 "Sleep Long" (Operation Ivy) feat. (Aimee Allen) - 2:06
 "She" (Green Day) - 3:02
 "…And We Thought That Nation-States Were a Bad Idea" feat. (Fat Mike) (Propagandhi) - 2:24
 "She’s Gone" (NOFX) feat. (Aimee Allen) - 3:47
 "AM" (Tony Sly) - 2:24
 "Alien 8" (Lagwagon) - 1:52
 "Some Kinda Hate" (Misfits) - 1:59
 "2RAK005" (Bracket) - 2:48
 "Sink, Florida, Sink" (Against Me!) - 2:45
 "Jean is Dead" (Descendents) - 1:34
 "Take Me Home (Piss Off)" (Snuff) - 4:04

Personnel 
Band
 Graham Palmer - bass, vocals
 Todd Rosenberg - drums, percussion
 Mark Bush - trumpet
 Sascha Lazor - guitar, banjo
 Dustin Lanker - organ
 Eduardo Hernandez - trombone
 Chuck Robertson - vocals, guitar

Production
 Todd Rosenberg - engineering, mixing
 Cameron Webb - engineering, mixing
 Angus Cooke - engineering
 Rian Lewis - engineering
 Sascha Lazor - mixing
 Steve Corrao - mastering

Artwork
 Clemente Ruiz - photography
 Sergie Loobkoff - layout

References 

2018 albums
Covers albums
Fat Wreck Chords albums
Mad Caddies albums